A narrative typically ends in one set way, but certain kinds of narrative allow for multiple endings.

Comics
 The Death-Ray by Daniel Clowes.
 Cliff Hanger.

Literature

 The Choose Your Own Adventure series.
 Fighting Fantasy
 Life's Lottery
 The French Lieutenant's Woman

Theater
Ayn Rand's 1934 play Night of January 16th allowed the audience to affect the ending by acting as the "jury" and voting the defendant "innocent" or "guilty".
The 1985 musical The Mystery of Edwin Drood.
Dario Fo's 1970 play, Accidental Death of an Anarchist.
The long-running play Shear Madness has multiple, audience-selected endings

Films
DVDs and Blu-ray discs may include an alternate ending as a special feature. These are usually not considered canon.

Movies which include multiple endings within the main cut of the film:

Clue
Wayne's World and its sequel, Wayne's World 2
Scarface
Sliding Doors
Run Lola Run
Harikrishnans
28 Days Later
Unfriended: Dark Web
Black Mirror: Bandersnatch
1408 (film)

Television
Crown Court (TV series)
Do the Right Thing (BBC TV series, 1994-1995)

Animation
Dragon's Lair and Space Ace
The fifth season finale of the Rooster Teeth web-series, Red vs. Blue

Video games

See also
 Alternate ending
 Interactive fiction
 Visual novel

References

Plot (narrative)
Video game gameplay

Endings